Dinabandhu Institution, also known as Shibpur Dinobundhoo Institution, established in 1948, is a research based undergraduate college in Howrah, India. It is affiliated with the University of Calcutta.

Departments

Science

Chemistry
Physics
Mathematics
Computer Science
Botany
Zoology

Arts and Commerce

Bengali
English
Sanskrit
Urdu
History
Political Science
Philosophy
Economics
Sociology
Commerce

Accreditation
Recently, Dinabandhu Institution has been awarded B+ grade by the National Assessment and Accreditation Council (NAAC). The college is also recognized by the University Grants Commission (UGC).

See also 
List of colleges affiliated to the University of Calcutta
Education in India
Education in West Bengal

References

External links
Dinabandhu Institution

Educational institutions established in 1948
University of Calcutta affiliates
Universities and colleges in Howrah district
1948 establishments in West Bengal